William Mudie (26 April 1836 – 25 January 1871) was an English professional cricketer who played first-class cricket from 1856 to 1868. He was a right-handed batsman and a right-arm slow underarm bowler who played mainly for Surrey County Cricket Club and made 41 known appearances in first-class matches.

Mudie was born  at Kennington in London in 1836. He was the youngest member of the All England XI that toured Australia in 1861–62. He died in 1871 at Vauxhall in London.

References

1836 births
1871 deaths
English cricketers
English cricketers of 1826 to 1863
English cricketers of 1864 to 1889
Surrey cricketers
North v South cricketers